George Andrew Strief (October 16, 1856 – April 1, 1946) was an American professional baseball second baseman and outfielder. Strief played in Major League Baseball (MLB) from 1879 to 1885 for the Cleveland Blues, Pittsburgh Alleghenys, St. Louis Browns, Kansas City Cowboys, Chicago Browns/Pittsburgh Stogies, and Philadelphia Athletics.

On May 3, 1882, Strief hit the first-ever home run in Pittsburgh Pirates history. Strief's home run came five years before the Pirates (then called the Pittsburgh Alleghenys) entered the National League. Until 1887, the club was a member of the American Association, and Strief's home run was against the Cincinnati Red Stockings in a 7-3 Pittsburgh loss. The game was only second, and first loss, in franchise history.

Strief set the record for most triples in a game, four, in 1885 (equalled by Bill Joyce in 1897). Also in 1885 he became the first player to collect five extra base hits in a game.

See also
 List of Major League Baseball triples records

References

External links

1856 births
1946 deaths
Baseball players from Cincinnati
Cleveland Blues (NL) players
Pittsburgh Alleghenys players
St. Louis Browns (AA) players
Kansas City Cowboys (UA) players
Chicago Browns/Pittsburgh Stogies players
Philadelphia Athletics (AA) players
19th-century baseball players
Minor league baseball managers
Columbus Buckeyes (minor league) players
Pittsburgh Allegheny players
Savannah (minor league baseball) players
Minneapolis Millers (baseball) players
Syracuse Stars (minor league baseball) players
Toledo Maumees (minor league) players
Charleston Seagulls players
Mansfield (minor league baseball) players
Canton Nadjys players